Janna, a well-known Kannada poet of the early 13th century who also served in the capacity of a minister and a builder of temples

Janna may also refer to:

Given name
Janna Allen (1957–1993), American songwriter
Janna Dominguez (born 1990), Filipina actress, host, comedian
Janna Gur, Israeli food writer, editor and cook book author 
Janna Holmstedt (born 1972), Swedish artist 
Janna Hurmerinta, Finnish R&B, soul and neo soul singer, songwriter and pianist. Also known by her mononym Janna
Janna Levin (born 1967), American theoretical cosmologist
Janna McMahan, American author
Janna Michaels, American former child actress
Janna Malamud Smith, American non-fiction author 
Janna Taylor (born 1948), speaker for the Montana House of Representatives
 Janna Ordonia, a recurring character in Star vs. the Forces of Evil 
Janna, the Storm's Fury, a playable champion character from the multiplayer online battle arena video game League of Legends

Others
Anthene janna, a butterfly in the family Lycaenidae
Janna Systems, Canadian relationship management solutions company, now acquired by Siebel Systems Inc.
Janna (album), 2003 album by Ernst Reijseger with Mola Sylla and Serigne C.M. Gueye
Janna (TV series), German-Polish children's television series
The Janna Mysteries, medieval crime series by Felicity Pulman

See also
Ain Janna, a village is located in the Ajloun Governorate in the north-western part of Jordan
Jana (disambiguation)
Jenna